Holy Land is the second album by Brazilian metal band Angra. It is a concept album whose theme is centered on the Brazilian land by the time it was discovered in the 16th century (from a European perspective), as depicted in the art surrounding the album release. Once fully opened, the cover illustration turns out to be an old 15th-century map. Title track "Holy Land" contains many indigenous and folkloric influences taken from Brazilian music, but also includes classical arrangements symbolizing Europe at the time.

The opening track "Crossing" features a rendition of O Crux Ave by Giovanni Pierluigi da Palestrina. The following songs deal with life in the "holy land" prior to its colonization by the Portuguese and subsequent changes Brazil underwent upon their arrival.

According to drummer Ricardo Confessori, the track "Nothing to Say" was developed around a drum riff he created around 1994 at a small rural property owned by guitarist Rafael Bittencourt. His band mates heard it and soon joined in to create the rest of the song, including the single-note opening riff.

Track listing

Personnel
Angra
Andre Matos – lead vocals, piano, orchestral arrangements, keyboards, organ
Kiko Loureiro – lead guitar, backing vocals, additional percussion on "Holy Land"
Rafael Bittencourt – rhythm guitar, backing vocals, additional percussion on "Holy Land"
Luís Mariutti – bass
Ricardo Confessori – drums, percussion on "Holy Land"
Guests
Alto vocals – Mônica Thiele
Soprano vocals – Celeste Gattai
Bass vocals – Reginaldo Gomes
Conductor – Naomi Munakata
Choir – The Farrambamba Vocal Group
Computer, keyboard programming and orchestral arrangements – Sascha Paeth
Flute – Paulo Bento
Strings (berimbau) – Pixu Flores
Viola – Ricardo Kubala
Whistle, tamborim and percussive effects – Castora
Double bass – Holger Stonjek

Recording information
Recorded at Hansen Studios in Hamburg, Big House Studios in Hannover and HG Studio in Wolfsburg, Germany 1995.
Vocal, piano and organ recordings at Vox Klangstudio, Bendestorf, Germany 1995-1996.
Mixed by Charlie Bauerfeind at Vox Klang Studio and Hansen Studios, January 1996.
Engineered by Charlie Bauerfeind and Sascha Paeth
Brazilian, Latin percussion parts and percussion (congas, djembe, timbales, claves, triangle, repinique, toms) production by Tuto Ferraz
All guest performances recorded at Djembe Studio, São Paulo, Brazil, August/October 1995.
Flute solo on "Carolina IV" is a citation/variation from "Bebê", a theme by Hermeto Pascoal.
Taiko excerpts & sounds on track 5 taken from the album "Ondekoza New".
Speech & sounds on "The Shaman" taken from the album "Musica Popular do Norte n°4".

References

External links
www.progarchives.com/

1996 albums
Angra (band) albums
Albums produced by Charlie Bauerfeind
Concept albums